This is a list of slums in Lagos.

Slums 

Agege 
Ajegunle 
Amukoko
Badia
Bariga
Bodija
Ijeshatedo/Itire
Ilaje
Iwaya
Makoko 
Mushin
Oke-Offa Babasale
Somolu
Ikorodu

See also

 List of slums

References 

Slums
Nigeria
Slums in Nigeria
Housing in Nigeria